is a Japanese women's professional shogi player ranked 3-dan.

Women's shogi professional
Suzuki advanced to the finals of the 3rd  in August 2017, but lost to Sakura Ishimoto.

Promotion history
Suzuki's promotion history is as follows.
 2-kyū: October 1, 2002
 1-kyū: April 1, 2004
 1-dan: April 1, 2006
 2-dan: May 10, 2012
 3-dan: September 22, 2020

Note: All ranks are women's professional ranks.

References

External links
 ShogiHub: Suzuki, Kanna

Japanese shogi players
Living people
People from Futtsu
Women's professional shogi players
1987 births
People from Chiba Prefecture
Professional shogi players from Chiba Prefecture